Palomares del Río is a city located in the province of Seville, Spain. According to the 2021 census (INE), the city has a population of 9020 inhabitants.

References

External links
Palomares del Río - Sistema de Información Multiterritorial de Andalucía
Palomares del Río - Ayuntamiento

Municipalities of the Province of Seville